The Hunger Games: Mockingjay – Part 1 is a 2014 American dystopian science fiction war film directed by Francis Lawrence from a screenplay by Peter Craig and Danny Strong, based on the 2010 novel Mockingjay by Suzanne Collins. The sequel to The Hunger Games: Catching Fire (2013), it is the third installment in The Hunger Games film series. The film features an ensemble cast that includes Jennifer Lawrence, Josh Hutcherson, Liam Hemsworth, Woody Harrelson, Elizabeth Banks, Julianne Moore, Philip Seymour Hoffman, Jeffrey Wright, Stanley Tucci, and Donald Sutherland.

The story continues to follow Katniss Everdeen; having twice survived the Hunger Games, Katniss finds herself in District 13. Under the leadership of President Coin and the advice of her trusted friends, Katniss reluctantly becomes the symbol of a mass rebellion against the Capitol and fights to save Peeta and a nation moved by her courage. 

Principal photography for both parts of the film began on September 23, 2013, in Atlanta, before moving to Paris for two weeks of filming and officially concluding on June 20, 2014, in Berlin.

Mockingjay – Part 1 was released in the United States on November 21, 2014. Like its predecessors, the film was a commercial success grossing $55 million on its opening day, making it the largest opening day of 2014 and the sixth-largest in November. The film went to the No. 1 spot during its opening weekend with a $273.8 million worldwide gross, becoming the biggest opening of 2014 and marking The Hunger Games film series as the only franchise to have three films earn over $100 million in a weekend. The film earned over $755 million worldwide, making it the fifth highest-grossing film of 2014 and the second-highest-grossing entry in The Hunger Games series.

Part 1 received generally positive reviews from critics, who commended its acting, musical score and political subtext, but received criticism for its pacing and lack of action. The filmmaker's decision to split the novel into two separate adaptations was also criticized, with many feeling that the decision was unnecessary. It is the lowest-rated The Hunger Games film of the franchise, according to review aggregators Rotten Tomatoes and Metacritic. The film had garnered a nomination for Best Science Fiction Film at the 41st Saturn Awards. For her performance, Lawrence received a nomination for Best Actress in an Action Movie at the 20th Critics' Choice Awards and a Saturn Award nomination. The song "Yellow Flicker Beat" also received a nomination for Best Original Song at the 72nd Golden Globe Awards and Critics' Choice Awards.

The film was followed by The Hunger Games: Mockingjay – Part 2 in 2015.

Plot

After being rescued from the destroyed arena in the 75th Hunger Games, tributes Katniss Everdeen, Beetee, and Finnick Odair are taken to District 13, a below-ground district isolated from Panem that has been spearheading the rebellion. Katniss is reunited with her mother and sister Prim and is introduced to President Alma Coin, the rebel leader. Katniss is told that her arrow destroying the forcefield led to riots in over half the districts, joining District 13 in the rebellion, which caused Snow to bomb District 12 in retaliation. Coin asks her to become the "Mockingjay"—a symbol of the rebellion—as part of a "hearts and minds" strategy. Katniss reluctantly agrees after seeing Peeta being manipulated on state television to quell the rebellion. She visits the ruins of District 12, her old house somehow untouched with white roses from President Snow inside.

Katniss meets her film team and is given Effie Trinket as a stylist and close friend, Gale, as a bodyguard. They go to District 8 where Katniss is filmed being saluted by dozens of wounded civilians at a hospital; Snow, seeing the footage, orders an airstrike at the hospital, killing everyone inside. The crew films Katniss and Gale shooting down two Capitol hovercraft and Katniss' rage-filled threat: "If we burn, you burn with us." Afterwards, loggers in District 7 revolt, shouting the same phrase and killing Peacekeepers by detonating land mines.

Katniss and her team travel to District 12. Katniss is filmed singing "The Hanging Tree." Hundreds of protesters in District 5, singing the same anthem, launch a suicidal human wave attack against a hydroelectric dam that is the Capitol's primary source of electricity. The attack successfully implodes and breaches the dam, causing a blackout that forces the Capitol to revert to secondary generators. That night, Katniss watches Peeta being interviewed by Caesar Flickerman, the Games' former presenter, when Coin and Beetee hijack the signal to air a clip of Katniss. After seeing it, Peeta suddenly shouts a warning that the Capitol is about to attack District 13. Coin orders a mass evacuation into deep, underground shelters, and the facility survives the attack. Upon emerging, Katniss discovers the area littered with white roses; she concludes that Snow orchestrated this to inform her that whenever she condemns the Capitol, they’ll torture Peeta in retaliation.

Coin dispatches an elite special-forces team to rescue Peeta and remaining victors Johanna Mason, Enobaria, and Annie Cresta from their prison. Beetee hijacks the Capitol's defense system with a "propo" narrated by Finnick to convince more districts to side with the rebellion in which Finnick reveals that Snow would force "desirable" tributes (including Finnick himself) into prostitution with the threat of killing their families if they refused (which happened to Johanna) and that Snow only became the leader of Panem because he poisoned his opponents. When the propo proves not to be enough, Katniss communicates directly with Snow as a further distraction to buy enough time. Gale's team rescues the victors and escapes the Capitol easily, indicating the Capitol reduced its security on purpose. When Katniss greets Peeta, he unexpectedly attacks and strangles her into unconsciousness before being knocked out by Boggs.

Katniss wakes up and is informed that Peeta has been "hijacked"—brainwashed into trying to kill her, which explains why the Capitol allowed them to escape with him. Peeta is placed in solitary confinement, while a serum is developed to reverse the hijacking effects.

Coin announces that the rebels' next objective is the Capitol's principal military stronghold in District 2—now the only district remaining loyal to the Capitol.

Cast

 Jennifer Lawrence as Katniss Everdeen
 Josh Hutcherson as Peeta Mellark
 Liam Hemsworth as Gale Hawthorne
 Woody Harrelson as Haymitch Abernathy
 Elizabeth Banks as Effie Trinket
 Julianne Moore as President Alma Coin
 Philip Seymour Hoffman as Plutarch Heavensbee
 Jeffrey Wright as Beetee Latier
 Stanley Tucci as Caesar Flickerman
 Donald Sutherland as President Coriolanus Snow
 Willow Shields as Primrose Everdeen
 Sam Claflin as Finnick Odair
 Jena Malone as Johanna Mason
 Stef Dawson as Annie Cresta
 Mahershala Ali as Boggs
 Natalie Dormer as Cressida
 Wes Chatham as Castor
 Elden Henson as Pollux
 Patina Miller as Commander Paylor
 Evan Ross as Messalla
 Robert Knepper as Antonius
 Sarita Choudhury as Egeria

Production

Pre-production
On July 10, 2012, Lionsgate announced that the third and final installment in the series, Mockingjay, would be split into two parts. The Hunger Games: Mockingjay – Part 1 was released on November 21, 2014, and The Hunger Games: Mockingjay – Part 2 was released on November 20, 2015. Many directors, including Rian Johnson, Francis Lawrence and Alfonso Cuarón were considered for the job. On November 1, 2012, Lawrence, director of Catching Fire, announced he would return to direct both final parts in the series.

On December 6, 2012, Danny Strong announced that he would be writing the third and fourth films. On February 15, 2013, Lionsgate confirmed the script for Part 1 was written by Strong, giving him permission to write Part 2. Later in August, Hemsworth confirmed that shooting of the film would begin in September 2013.

The film's production began on September 16, 2013, in Boston, Atlanta, and Los Angeles. Studio Babelsberg co-produced and oversaw production services for the film.

Casting
On August 26, 2013, it was announced that actress Stef Dawson had joined the cast and would portray Annie Cresta. Lionsgate announced on September 13, 2013, that Julianne Moore had joined the cast of both Mockingjays parts to play President Alma Coin. Over the next month, Patina Miller, Mahershala Ali, Wes Chatham, and Elden Henson joined the cast as Commander Paylor, Boggs, Castor, and Pollux, respectively. There was a casting call for extras on September 23. Robert Knepper was cast as Antonius, a character who does not appear in the books and is an addition to the adaptation. Knepper has stated that during his audition he knew that the lines he received were not what he would end up doing, adding that "they [Lionsgate] are so secretive about this." Wyatt Russell was originally offered a role in both parts of Mockingjay, but his father Kurt confirmed in September 2013 that he turned down the offer to star in 22 Jump Street.

Filming
Shooting began on September 23, 2013, in Atlanta and concluded on June 20, 2014, in Berlin. Part 1 was filmed back-to-back with Part 2. In mid-October, the crews were spotted filming in Rockmart. The crew and cast took a break to promote The Hunger Games: Catching Fire and filming resumed on December 2, 2013. On December 14, 2013, shooting took place at the Marriott Marquis in Atlanta, Georgia. On December 18, shooting began at Caldwell Tanks in Newnan, Georgia.

Philip Seymour Hoffman died on February 2, 2014. Lionsgate released a statement stating that Hoffman had completed filming most of his scenes prior to his death. A dedication to him appears ahead of the closing credits.

On April 18, 2014, producer Nina Jacobson announced that filming in Atlanta had just wrapped up, followed by director Francis Lawrence announcing the next day about moving production to Europe. It was announced that they would be filming battle scenes in Paris and at Berlin Tempelhof Airport in Berlin. They began filming in the streets of Paris and in the city of Ivry-sur-Seine on May 7, where Lawrence and Hemsworth were spotted during the filming of some scenes among extras.

On May 9, it was reported that filming was taking place in Noisy le Grand, Paris where Lawrence, Hemsworth, Hutcherson, and Claflin were spotted on the set which re-created the world of Panem. It is the same location where Brazil was filmed in 1984.

Costumes
Christian Cordella, a costume illustrator on the first movie, returned to sketch the outfits for District 13.

Music

The music was created to convey the dark feel of the film. On October 9, 2014, it was revealed that the Trinity School boys' choir recorded tracks for the score, written by James Newton Howard. Jennifer Lawrence performed the film's version of the song "The Hanging Tree", originally featured in the novel, but was not thrilled about having to sing and cried the day of the performance. As of the evening of November 25, 2014, the song was #4 on the Apple's iTunes top 150 list. "The Hanging Tree" also peaked at #1 in Austria and Hungary and peaked at #12 on Billboard Hot 100 in the U.S.

Score

Marketing
Tim Palen, the head of marketing for Lionsgate said, "When we started, we decided to look at this as one big movie that's eight hours long. Otherwise, it's going to be kind of overwhelming to do a new campaign for each movie." He also added that he saw the biggest potential in international growth and that they matched Iron Man 3 domestically, but were aiming to improve internationally for the two Mockingjay films. He revealed in an interview with Variety that there would be reveals of the marketing campaign at the Cannes Film Festival in May and San Diego Comic Con in July.

On May 14, 2014 TheHungerGamesExclusive.com was launched. It featured three stills from the movie, featuring Woody Harrelson, Julianne Moore, Philip Seymour Hoffman and Jeffrey Wright with an additional behind-the-scenes still of director Francis Lawrence and Mahershala Ali. The website also featured other content, including a short GIF image of Julianne Moore as President Coin and a video interview with Moore. There was also an in-depth interview with director Francis Lawrence, producer Nina Jacobson and screenwriter Peter Craig. A page from the script of Part 1 was also released in addition to a motion poster, with the tagline, "Fire burns brighter in the darkness."

On May 17, 2014, while principal photography was underway in Paris, some of the cast and crew including Lawrence, Hutcherson, Hemsworth, Claflin, Moore, Sutherland, Lawrence, and Jacobson attended the 2014 Cannes Film Festival for a photo shoot and party bash to excite international investors. Co-chairman of Lionsgate Rob Friedman said in response to why they would incur such big expense even though the film isn't actually playing at the festival that it was convenient as the cast were in Europe already and that "it's a big opportunity for our international distributors to actually hear what the worldwide plans are for the film, which opens in November. Cannes is the best publicity opportunity from an international penetration perspective."

Kabam announced their partnership with Lionsgate to create a mobile game based on The Hunger Games: Mockingjay Part 1, to tie in with the film's release. Kabam produced an exclusive role playing, card collection mobile game. In the game, players assume the identity of District members sent on a mission in order to build their alliance, liberate their District, and rebuild Panem. "Lionsgate has an unparalleled track record of developing and producing blockbuster movie franchises like The Hunger Games," said Kabam Chief Operating Officer Kent Wakeford. "Partnering with Lionsgate, Kabam will build a mobile game that's as much fun to play as the movie is to watch. The game will be developed in Kabam's China studio, the same place where the hit film-based game The Hobbit: The Battle of the Five Armies was created and went on to generate more than $100 million in revenue during its first year."

The film was not listed on the schedule for San Diego Comic-Con International 2014, which raised questions on their absence by fans and the press. Lionsgate announced on July 18, 2014, a week before the event, that the film would have a presence at the convention. Lionsgate partnered up with Samsung to debut the (including the viral videos which were considered 'teasers', third) teaser trailer on Samsung's new Galaxy Tab S at a special event on Friday, July 25, which was being hosted off-site at the Hard Rock Hotel. The partnership allowed Samsung users to view the trailer before the online release, download the first two movies for free as well as be given a free complimentary ticket to the movie. On July 28, the teaser trailer officially debuted online through the movie's official Facebook page and YouTube account.  Within minutes, #MockingjayTeaserTrailerToday, #OurLeadertheMockingjay, and #OfficialTeaserTrailer became trending topics worldwide on Twitter. A full worldwide official trailer was released on September 15.

Viral marketing

A viral marketing campaign began on June 21, 2014, with the return of TheCapitol.PN

On June 25, TheCapitol.PN viral site released a video titled "President Snow's Address - 'Together As One'" featuring a speech by Donald Sutherland, in character as President Snow addressing the citizens of Panem and warning them that if they fight the system, they will be the ones to face the repercussions. The video also briefly features Josh Hutcherson, in character as Peeta Mellark, who at the final events of the previous film was taken hostage by the Capitol. The video went viral on YouTube becoming the most watched trailer during the last week of June in the US while trending as the most "Popular Video on YouTube" in Australia and Canada. The video, billed as a teaser trailer, was attached to screenings of Transformers: Age of Extinction beginning June 28.

Two weeks later on July 9, Capitol TV released a second viral video titled 'President Snow's Address — Unity' featuring again another speech by President Snow with Peeta Mellark standing beside him, but this time accompanied by Jena Malone in character as Johanna Mason, who was also captured by the Capitol at the end of the previous film, and a group of peacekeepers. The speech was interrupted by Jeffrey Wright, in character as Beetee Latier, a technician from District 13, to announce that "the Mockingjay lives." Within minutes, #TheMockingjayLives and '#2 - Unity' became the top two trending topics worldwide on Twitter. The video, billed as the second teaser trailer for the film, was played with screenings of Dawn of the Planet of the Apes.

On July 24, shortly before the trailer's official release, a teaser poster for the movie was posted on The Capitol's Instagram account, but was quickly deleted. Shortly after the removal of the poster, the account issued an apology "[for the] technical issues", presenting the poster's posting as a hack from the District 13 rebellions.

On August 6, after few clues given on the official Facebook page, www.district13.co.in was launched. The website introduced new posters for the District 13 characters including Beetee, Coin, Plutarch, Finnick, Haymitch and Effie.

Political ramifications
On November 20, 2014, some showings were reportedly canceled in Thailand because protestors were using the three-finger salute at demonstrations against the country's military government.

On November 24, 2014, it was reported that in relation to the Ferguson unrest regarding the shooting of Michael Brown, a protester had scrawled graffiti reading "If we burn, you burn with us" on an arch in St. Louis, Missouri.

On November 27, 2014, Hong Kong protestors used the three-finger salute while occupying Mong Kok.

On September 11, 2015, some Catalan pro-independence protestors were using the three-finger salute at the Free Way to the Catalan Republic against Spain's government.

Release
The Hunger Games: Mockingjay – Part 1 was released on November 19, 2014, in 9 territories including France, Greece, Scandinavia and Brazil, and then expanded to a further 59 on November 20, 2014, including the UK, Germany, Australia, Italy, Mexico and South Korea. With 17 more released on November 21, 2014, including the United States, the total launch was in 85 markets, making it the biggest release of the year and Lionsgate's widest release ever. This was surpassed by its sequel across 87 markets in 2015. The film was released in China on February 8, 2015, in 2D and 3D, making it the first film in the franchise to be released in 3D in any territory and debuted in more than 4,000 screens.  Director Francis Lawrence stated: "we recently saw the 3-D version of Mockingjay – Part 1 before its release in China, and the new level of immersion was really fantastic." The film was dedicated to the memory of Philip Seymour Hoffman.

Home video
The Hunger Games: Mockingjay Part 1 was released on Digital HD on February 17, 2015, and was followed by a Blu-ray/DVD release on March 6, 2015. It topped the home video sales chart for two consecutive weeks despite facing competition from Night at the Museum: Secret of the Tomb. The entire Hunger Games series was released on 4K UHD Blu-Ray on  November 8, 2016.

Reception

Box office
The Hunger Games: Mockingjay – Part 1 grossed $337.1 million in the USA & Canada, and $418.2 million in other countries, for a worldwide total of $755.4 million against $125 million budget ($190 million including promotion and advertising costs). Calculating in all expenses, Deadline Hollywood estimated that the film made a profit of $211.61 million. Worldwide, it is the fifth-highest-grossing film of 2014. Its worldwide opening of $273.8 million is the sixteenth-largest of all time, the second-largest opening of 2014 behind Transformers: Age of Extinction ($302.1 million), and the largest among The Hunger Games franchise.

North America
In the U.S. and Canada, the film was released across 3,200 theaters on Thursday night, November 20, 2014, and was widened to 4,151 theaters on Friday, November 21, 2014. The film earned $17 million from Thursday night previews which is the biggest of 2014 but was lower than its two predecessors. It earned $55 million in its opening day which is the largest opening day of 2014 and the sixth-largest in November but nevertheless still lower than its predecessors. It is the fifteenth film to debut on Friday with $50 million or more, and the nineteenth film to earn $50 million or more in a single day. The film topped the box office in its opening weekend with $121.9 million, and became the biggest opening of 2014 surpassing the $100 million record of Transformers: Age of Extinction as well as becoming the fifteenth-largest,  the 28th film to debut atop with over $100 million, and the only franchise to have three films earn over $100 million in a weekend. Its opening weekend is also the sixth-largest of November. Its opening weekend gross was still relatively lower than the openings of The Hunger Games ($152 million) and Catching Fire ($158 million). In its second weekend the film remained at the summit earning $56.9 million and set a record for the third-highest 5-day Thanksgiving gross with $82.6 million behind The Hunger Games: Catching Fire ($109.9 million) and Frozen ($93.6 million) and the fifth-highest 3-day Thanksgiving gross with $56.9 million. The film topped the box office for three consecutive weekends before being overtaken by Exodus: Gods and Kings in its fourth weekend. The film passed the $300 million mark in its 6th weekend (37 days later) and became the second film of 2014 to earn over $300 million at the box office after Guardians of the Galaxy. On Wednesday, January 21, 2015, sixty-one days after its initial release, the film surpassed Guardians of the Galaxy and became the highest-grossing film of 2014 in North America until it was surpassed by American Sniper in the next two months.

It earned $337.1 million at the North American box office making it the third-highest-grossing film in The Hunger Games franchise, the second-highest-grossing film of 2014 (behind American Sniper), the fourth-highest-grossing science fiction film based on a book, the fourth-highest-grossing young-adult adaptation. and the 36th-highest-grossing film in North America. It is also the first film to cross the $300 million mark without 3D or IMAX since Indiana Jones and the Kingdom of the Crystal Skull (2008), and also the highest-grossing non-3D, non IMAX film since Pirates of the Caribbean: Dead Man's Chest (2006).

Outside North America
Outside North America, Mockingjay – Part 1 was also released on the same day in 85 other markets, with the notable exceptions of China, Japan, and India, making it the widest release of any film in 2014. The film earned over $33 million in two days (Wednesday–Thursday) and $67.5 million in three days (Wednesday–Friday) from 17,000 screens. In its opening weekend overseas, the film earned $154.3 million from 17,963 screens in 85 markets which is 4% higher than Catching Fire. The film remained at number one in its second and third weekend overseas earning $67 million and $32.9 million, respectively. In its fourth weekend, the film fell to number two as a result of being overtaken by The Hobbit: The Battle of the Five Armies.

The film's top openings occurred in the UK, Ireland and Malta ($19.9 million), Germany ($13.7 million), Mexico ($12.1 million), Russia and the CIS ($11.1 million), France ($10.5 million), Australia ($10.1 million), Brazil ($8.8 million) and India ($5.1 million). The film also grossed $3.9 million in the Philippines. In China, where the film was released over two and a half months later—on February 8, 2015, it had a strong opening day with $9.87 million and went on to earn $31.4 million through its opening week, which is more than what Catching Fire earned through its entire run. The film had an unsuccessful opening in Japan with $500,000 debuting at eighth place at the Japanese box office and ended up making a mere $1.6 million after its run.

It became the highest-grossing Hunger Games film of all time in 31 countries including Brazil, Italy, Chile, Venezuela, Central America, and Portugal.

Critical response
The Hunger Games: Mockingjay – Part 1 received generally positive reviews from critics, with praise aimed at its political subtext and acting performances (particularly that of Lawrence), but criticism for its lack of action and the makers' splitting the source material for two separate adaptations. The site's consensus reads: "The Hunger Games: Mockingjay – Part 1 sets up the franchise finale with a penultimate chapter loaded with solid performances and smart political subtext, though it comes up short on the action front." The film holds a Metacritic score of 64 out of 100, based on 46 critics, indicating "generally favorable reviews". Audiences surveyed by CinemaScore gave the film an "A−" grade, indicating positive reactions from paying viewers.

Cath Clarke of Time Out gave the film four out of five stars. She praised the politics as "tensely gripping" and felt it had a lot to say about the "ethical ambiguities of war." She praised Lawrence's performance as "strong, smart, stubborn, angry and full of heart" and noted it had grown "deeper and darker." Kevin Harley, who reviewed the film for Total Film, also awarded the film four out of five stars. He felt the film held up due to Lawrence's performance and solid supporting cast. He also offered praise to the action scenes and diverse story telling. He concluded that the movie was "gutsy" and managed to successfully divide the novel into a film "less on scraps than strategy" and "less on action than debates" though he noted this threatened to "distance viewers."

Robbie Collin awarded the film three out of five stars. In his review for The Telegraph, he praised the film for being "intense, stylish, topical, well-acted" and declared that it "remains one of the most fascinating, vividly realised fantasy landscapes in recent cinema." Despite praising Lawrence and Hoffman's performance, he felt that it was overcrowded with "two hours of preamble with no discernible payoff." He concluded that the film "fell short" and "could not be called satisfying." Henry Barnes of The Guardian also gave the film three out of five stars. He felt it offered "thrills" despite "lacking a solid structure" and featured "limp special effects." He was also critical of the "creaky script" and felt it lacked some of the "terror" of the previous installments, but praised Lawrence for her performance.

Todd McCarthy, who reviewed the film for The Hollywood Reporter, felt the installment was "disappointingly bland and unnecessarily protracted." He was critical of the film's leisurely pace and noted it felt "like a manufactured product through and through, ironic and sad given its revolutionary theme." Richard Corliss of Time felt the film was a placeholder for the second installment and noted "Lawrence isn't given much opportunity to do anything spectacularly right here."

Accolades

Sequel

On July 10, 2012, Lionsgate announced that the second part of the Mockingjay adaptation was set for a release on November 20, 2015.  Francis Lawrence announced that he would return to direct the final part as well.

References

External links

 
 
 

2010s adventure films
2010s thriller films
2014 films
2014 science fiction films
American dystopian films
American science fiction thriller films
American sequel films
Babelsberg Studio films
Films directed by Francis Lawrence
Films scored by James Newton Howard
Films set in North America
Films shot in Atlanta
Films shot in Berlin
Films shot in Georgia (U.S. state)
Films shot in Paris
Films with screenplays by Danny Strong
Films with screenplays by Peter Craig
3 Part 1
2010s English-language films
Lionsgate films
Science fiction adventure films
Films produced by Jon Kilik
2010s American films